Vladimirovskoye is a rural locality (a selo) in Kelermesskoye Rural Settlement of Giaginsky District, Adygea, Russia. The population was 88 as of 2018. There are 4 streets.

Geography 
Vladimirovskoye is located 19 km southeast of Giaginskaya (the district's administrative centre) by road. Tkachyov is the nearest rural locality.

References 

Rural localities in Giaginsky District